India's Magic Star is an Indian reality show that aired on STAR One. It was hosted by Karishma Tanna. Every participant performed several magic tricks in this game show.

The winner of this series was Tejas.

Concept
The show aims to uncover the latent magical talent in the country, where in several magicians slug it out to win the honour of becoming India's next magic star. Along the way, the magicians would have to prove themselves adept at various forms of magic - stage magic, street magic, illusions and others. Every week you will witness increasingly difficult, daring and dazzling magic acts. The acts themselves would be a mixture of magic, glamour and entertainment.

Judges
 Jackie Shroff
 SAC Vasanth
 Rajat Narsimhan
 Franz Harary

References

External links
Star One Official Website

Indian reality television series
Indian game shows
2010 Indian television series debuts
2010 Indian television series endings
Television magic shows
Star One (Indian TV channel) original programming